Francis Rous, also spelled Rouse (c. 1581 to 1659), was an English politician and Puritan religious author, who was Provost of Eton from 1644 to 1659, and briefly Speaker of the House of Commons in 1653.

Stepbrother of Parliamentary leader John Pym, he joined him in opposing Arminianism in the Church of England, and played a leading role in the impeachment of Archbishop Laud. When the First English Civil War began in 1642, he supported the 1643 Solemn League and Covenant, and was appointed to the Westminster Assembly.

Under the Protectorate, he moved away from his Presbyterian colleagues, becoming closer to the religious Independents, and Oliver Cromwell. He died in January 1659, and was buried in Eton College Chapel.

Biography
Francis Rous was born at Dittisham in Devon around 1581, fourth son of Sir Anthony Rous (ca 1555-1620), and his first wife, Elizabeth Southcote (1547-1585). His father remarried Philippa Colles (died 1620), mother of John Pym; his stepbrother became a close friend and political ally.

At some point after 1601, he married Philippa, 1575 to 1657; their son Francis, (1615–1643), became a distinguished classicist and doctor, but was disinherited by his father for marrying without his approval.

Career

Sir Anthony Rous was a devout Puritan, who instilled the same values in his children. Francis was educated at Pembroke College, Oxford, then known as Broadgates, and known for its "advanced Protestantism". In 1598, he moved to the University of Leiden, an important centre of study for Scots and English Calvinists.

As legal training was then considered part of an education, he attended the Middle Temple for a short period in 1601, but moved to Landrake, in Cornwall. There are few details of his life prior to 1626, although he produced several books, and Rous claimed in 1641 that he spent some of 1609 travelling in Europe with Sir Thomas Overbury, victim in one of the most famous murder cases of the period.

Understanding individuals from this period requires an appreciation of the centrality of religious belief in daily life, and politics. With the exception of Independents, who opposed any state church, most people believed in a 'universal' church, where everyone belonged to the same structure, and used the same practices; where Charles I, William Laud, Rous and others disagreed was the form it took, particularly within the Church of England. It was taken for granted good government depended on 'true religion', and as many also believed the Second Coming was imminent, it gave debates on what that meant a real urgency and importance.

"Puritan" was a term for anyone who wanted to reform, or 'purify', the Church of England, the most prominent being Presbyterians. Most of these factions considered themselves part of the national church; those who were expelled by the 1662 Act of Uniformity became Nonconformists. Like John Pym, Rous was a passionate opponent of Arminianism; between 1619 and 1623, he published three works focusing on idolatry and 'carnal gloriations' among the priesthood. 

In 1626, he was elected Member of Parliament for Truro, then Tregony in 1628. Rous and Pym led the attack on Roger Maynwaring and Robert Sibthorpe, two clergymen who published sermons supporting divine right of kings, and passive obedience. Essentially political arguments, they were seen as undermining the role of Parliament, and condemned as such. In a speech made in January 1629, Rous argued if Arminianism continued to spread, 'true religion' was doomed; this inspired much of the subsequent opposition to Archbishop Laud. Charles responded by dissolving Parliament, initiating the period of Personal Rule that continued until 1640.

Returned for Truro in the elections of April and November 1640 Long Parliament, Rous opened the debate on the legality of Laud's reforms in December 1640, and presented articles of impeachment against John Cosin in 1641. He sat in the Westminster Assembly, took the Solemn League and Covenant, and in 1644, became Provost of Eton College, a position he retained until his death in 1659.

In 1643, Rous published his metrical paraphrases of the Book of Psalms, The Psalms of David set forth in English meeter, to be used in the Churches of England and Scotland. His text was heavily edited by a committee of translators, and in 1650 his Psalms were approved for use by the General Assembly of the Church of Scotland. Despite the extent of the revisions, Rous's text for Psalm 23 is generally considered to be the basis of the popular Christian hymn, "The Lord's my Shepherd".

After 1647, Rous moved closer to the Independents like Oliver Cromwell, and supported Charles' execution in 1649; since Presbyterians believed a 'well-ordered' monarchy was divinely mandated, The Protectorate presented a problem. In April 1649, he published a pamphlet titled The Lawfulness of Obeying the Present Government; claiming to be written by a 'true Presbyterian', this argued scripture required obedience to authority, regardless of who wielded it.

In early 1652, he served on the Committee for Propagation of the Gospel; led by Congregationalist minister John Owen, Parliament was dissolved before any of its suggested reforms were enacted. He was appointed Speaker of the House of Commons in 1653, although he proved incapable of managing the violent factionalism of Barebone's Parliament. Along with Charles Worsley and John Lambert, Rous was increasingly disturbed by the radicalism of many MPs. In a pre-planned move, on the morning of 12 December 1653, he led moderate members to Cromwell's office, where they resigned 'their powers unto his Excellency', effectively dissolving Parliament.

He was MP for Cornwall in 1656, along with Pym's nephew, Anthony Nicholl, but rejected a seat in the newly created Upper House. His wife Philippa was terminally ill, and died in December 1657; Rous followed in January 1659. His will left £50 to his grandson, 'so long as he shall be in preparation towards a profession', and funded three scholarships for Etonians to attend Pembroke College. He was buried in Eton College Chapel.

Bibliography; significant works
 1616; Meditations of Instruction, of Exhortation, of Reprofe: indeavouring the Edification and Reparation of the House of God 
 1619; The Arte of Happines, consisting of three Parts, whereof the first searcheth out the Happinesse of Man, the second particularly discovers and approves it, the third sheweth the Meanes to attayne and increase it;
 1622; Diseases of the Time attended by their Remedies;
 1623; Oyl of Scorpions;
 1626; Testis Veritatis; a reply to Richard Montagu's Appello Caesarem;
 1641; Catholicke Charity; originally written in response to a 1630 work of the Catholic Tobie Matthew, but could not be printed in the Laudian 1630s.
 1643; The Psalmes of David in English Meeter; used by the Church of Scotland until mid 19th century;
 1649; The Lawfulness of Obeying the Present Government;

References

Sources

External links
 

 

 

  

1580s births
1659 deaths
Year of birth uncertain

Speakers of the House of Commons of England
People from South Hams (district)
Members of the Parliament of England (pre-1707) for Devon
Roundheads
English subscribers to the Solemn League and Covenant 1643
Lay members of the Westminster Assembly
Alumni of Broadgates Hall, Oxford
Leiden University alumni
Members of the Middle Temple
Provosts of Eton College
English MPs 1626
English MPs 1628–1629
English MPs 1640 (April)
English MPs 1640–1648
English MPs 1653 (Barebones)
English MPs 1654–1655
English MPs 1656–1658
Members of Cromwell's Other House
Southcott family
Members of the Parliament of England for Truro
Members of the Parliament of England for Tregony
Members of the Parliament of England (pre-1707) for Cornwall